Edward Granville Browne FBA (7 February 1862 – 5 January 1926) was a British Iranologist. He published numerous articles and books, mainly in the areas of history and literature.

Life

Browne was born in Stouts Hill, Uley, Gloucestershire, England, the son of civil engineer Benjamin Chapman Browne and his wife, Annie. He was educated at Trinity College, Glenalmond, Burnside's School in Berkshire, Eton College, and the Newcastle College of Physical Science. He then read natural sciences at Pembroke College, Cambridge. He also studied Arabic with Edward Henry Palmer and William Wright, Persian with Edward Byles Cowell, and Turkish with Sir James Redhouse, motivated by an interest in the Turkish people. After graduating in 1882 he travelled to Constantinople.

Browne then spent a further two years at University of Cambridge studying the languages of India (defined then as Hindustani, Sanskrit, Persian, and Arabic) and also gained an M.B. in London. In 1887 he was made a Fellow of Pembroke, and then paid an extended visit to Iran. He returned to become a university lecturer in Persian. In April 1902 he was elected Sir Thomas Adams's Professor of Arabic at the University of Cambridge. Browne was mainly responsible for the creation at Cambridge of a school of living languages of Asia, in connection with the training of candidates for the Egyptian and Sudanese civil services, and the Lebanese consular service. He was on his sixtieth birthday the recipient of a large Festschrift.

Browne was one of the original trustees of the E. J. W. Gibb Memorial, an organisation which since 1905 has published the Gibb Memorial Series.

Persian Title of Mazhar-e Ali 
In London (1885), Brown met Haji Pirzadeh Naeini, a famous intellectual-mystic and world traveler of the Qajar dynasty period, through whom Browne broadened his interest and knowledge of Persian history, culture, and language. Resulting from their extensive exchanges and depth of personal bond, Browne was gifted, by Pirzadeh Naeini a set of Soufi garb, and received the title of "Mazhar-e Ali" "Manifestation of Ali." (Imam Ali was the first Imam of the Twelve Imams in Shia Islam and son-in-law to the Prophet Muhammad.)  Browne wore the garb in his meetings with Persians and used the title in signing all his Persian correspondence and writings.

In return, Brown called Pirzadeh "the guide of the path" and "the repository of the secrets of truth" and "the sage seeker of the path".  This relationship led Brown not only to broaden his knowledge and interest in Persia (Iran) but also to ask the British Foreign Office to assign Browne as a consul at the British Embassy to Tehran, which eventually resulted in his publishing, 1893, A Year Amongst The Persians.

Family

Browne married Alice Caroline (daughter of Francis Henry Blackburne Daniell) in 1906, and had two sons. The judge Sir Patrick Browne was his son.
He died in 1926 in Cambridge.

Works
Browne published in areas which few other Western scholars had explored. Many of his publications are related to Iran, either in the fields of history or Persian literature. He is perhaps best known for his documentation and historical narratives of Bábism as relayed by Arthur de Gobineau.  He published two translations of Bábí histories, and wrote several of the few Western accounts of early Bábí and Baháʼí history.

Browne was not a Baháʼí, but rather an Orientalist. His interest in the Bábí movement was piqued by a book by de Gobineau found while he was looking for materials on tasawwuf. The history A Traveller's Narrative was written by `Abdu'l-Bahá and translated by Browne, who added a large introduction and appendices. Browne was fascinated by the development of the written historical perspectives of the Baháʼís regarding successorship after the Báb including their idea of an independent dispensation of Bahá'u'lláh. These Baháʼí-authored works emphasized Bahá'u'lláh to a greater extent than the Báb and took a critical view against Subh-i-Azal, whom Arthur de Gobineau listed as the Báb's successor. Browne expressed sympathy for Subh-i-Azal and surprise at the route the religion had taken.

About the Baháʼí teachings he says:

Browne was granted four successive interviews with Bahá'u'lláh during the five days he was a guest at Bahjí (April 15–20, 1890).

In A Year Among the Persians (1893) he wrote a sympathetic portrayal of Persian society. After his death in 1926 it was reprinted and became a classic in English travel literature.  He also published the first volume of A Literary History of Persia in 1902 with subsequent volumes in 1906, 1920, and 1924. It remains a standard authority.

Among Iranians, Browne is well remembered today. A street named after him in Tehran, as well as his statue, remained even after the Iranian Revolution in 1979.

Bibliography
Works by Browne
Religious Systems of the World: A Contribution to the Study of Comparative Religion (1889)
A Traveller's Narrative: Written to illustrate the episode of the Bab (Cambridge: University Press, 1891)
A Year Among the Persians (1893)
A chapter from the history of Cannabis Indica (1897)
A Literary History of Persia (London: T. Fisher Unwin, 1902); reprinted (Cambridge: University Press, 1928).
The Persian Revolution of 1905–1909 (Cambridge: University Press, 1910)
Materials for the Study of the Babi Religion (Cambridge: University Press, 1918)
Arabian Medicine(1921)

Notes

References

Ross, Christopher N. B. "Lord Curzon and E. G. Browne Confront the 'Persian Question'", Historical Journal, 52, 2 (2009): 385–411, 
Biography, by Moojan Momen

External links

Online texts
 
Babism, chapter from the book Religious Systems of the World, transcribed and proofread by Graham Sorenson, April 1999
A Traveler's Narrative, transcribed and proofread by Alison Marshall
A Year Amongst the Persians, transcribed and proofread by Duane K. Troxel

1862 births
1926 deaths
People of the Persian Constitutional Revolution
People from Uley
English orientalists
English travel writers
Iranologists
Alumni of Pembroke College, Cambridge
Fellows of Pembroke College, Cambridge
British expatriates in Iran
Fellows of the British Academy
Sir Thomas Adams's Professors of Arabic